William Waldorf Astor II, 3rd Viscount Astor (13 August 1907 – 7 March 1966) was an English businessman and Conservative Party politician. He was also a member of the Astor family.

Background and education 

William was the eldest son of Waldorf Astor and Nancy Witcher Langhorne (by marriage, Viscountess Astor). He was educated at Eton and at New College, Oxford.

Political career 
In 1932, Astor was appointed secretary to Victor Bulwer-Lytton, 2nd Earl of Lytton, at a League of Nations Committee of Enquiry in what was then known as Manchuria. First elected to the House of Commons in 1935, he served as a Conservative Member of Parliament (MP) for Fulham East until 1945. Between 1936 and 1937 he was Parliamentary Private Secretary to the First Lord of the Admiralty, Samuel Hoare, who was then made Home Secretary in the new cabinet of Neville Chamberlain in 1937.

In World War II, he served as a naval intelligence officer, acquiring no distinction, but gaining many influential contacts. He returned as the Conservative MP for Wycombe in the 1951 general election, serving for ten months. On his father's death in 1952, he inherited his peerages, becoming the 3rd Viscount Astor and Baron Astor, with a seat in the House of Lords. This forced a by-election in Wycombe, which was won by the Conservative candidate John Hall.

Astor then took over the family's Cliveden estate in Buckinghamshire, where he and his family continued to live until 1966. Active in thoroughbred horse racing, he inherited Cliveden Stud, a horse farm and breeding operation in the village of Taplow near Maidenhead.

During the 1963 Profumo affair, Astor was accused of having an affair with Mandy Rice-Davies. In response to being told during one of the trials arising out of the scandal that Astor had denied having an affair with her, Rice-Davies famously replied, "Well he would, wouldn't he?"

Marriages and children
Astor married three times:

William married Sarah Norton (20 January 1920 – 4 February 2013; daughter of Richard, 6th Baron Grantley) on 14 June 1945 and they were divorced in 1953. They have one son, three grandchildren, and nine great-grandchildren:

William Astor, 4th Viscount Astor (William Waldorf Astor III; born 27 December 1951) he married Annabel Jones on 14 January 1976.

William remarried Phillipa Victoria Hunloke (10 December 1930 – 20 July 2005, whose maternal grandfather was Victor Cavendish, 9th Duke of Devonshire) on 26 April 1955 and they were divorced on 3 June 1960. They had one daughter together:

Emily Mary Astor (born 9 June 1956)

William Astor remarried, finally Bronwen Alun-Pugh on 14 October 1960. They had two daughters:

Janet Elizabeth Astor (born 1 December 1961) she married Earl of March and Kinrara on 30 November 1991.
Pauline Marian Astor (born 26 March 1964)

Astor died in Nassau, Bahamas, at age 58 from a heart attack and was buried in the Octagon Temple at Cliveden. His son succeeded him in the viscountcy.

References

External links 
 

1907 births
1966 deaths
Alumni of New College, Oxford
William
Conservative Party (UK) MPs for English constituencies
English people of American descent
English people of Dutch descent
English people of German descent
English people of Irish descent
English people of Scottish descent
Livingston family
People educated at Eton College
People educated at West Downs School
UK MPs 1935–1945
UK MPs 1951–1955
UK MPs who inherited peerages
Viscounts Astor
Foreign Office personnel of World War II